Julia deVille  is a New Zealand-born artist, jeweller and taxidermist, who only uses subjects in her taxidermy that have died of natural causes. She lives and works in Australia.

Early life and education 
Julia deVille was born in Wellington, New Zealand. She studied fashion for one year at Massey University and then moved to Melbourne in 2001 to study shoe making/design at RMIT. DeVille enrolled in two short jewellery courses in late 2002, at the same time she met her taxidermy mentor and started learning the craft of taxidermy.

She enrolled in the Advanced Diploma in Gold and Silversmithing from 2003 to 2004.

Career
DeVille only uses subjects in her taxidermy that have died of natural causes. She is an advocate for animal rights, and began including taxidermy in her art work in 2002, combining it with her jewellery making practice to produce small sculptures and installations. DeVille’s interest in memento mori traditions of the fifteenth to eighteenth centuries and Victorian mourning jewellery inform her wearable pieces.

Awards 

 2017: Winner, Sidney Myer Creative Fellowship, Sidney Myer Fund & The Myer Foundation
 2016: Winner, Waterhouse Natural Science Art Prize, with Neapolitan Bonbonaparte 
2016: Finalist, Deakin University Contemporary Small Sculpture Award, Deakin University Art Gallery, Melbourne.
 2015: Finalist, Kennedy Prize, Kennedy Arts Foundation, Adelaide.  Finalist, National Self-Portrait Prize, UQ Art Museum, Brisbane. Finalist, Gold Coast Art Prize, Gold Coast City Gallery, Queensland. Finalist, Manning Art Prize, Manning Regional Art Gallery, New South Wales. Finalist, Woollahra Small Sculpture Prize, Sydney. Finalist, Victorian Craft Award, Craft Victoria, Melbourne
 2014: Winner, Scope Galleries Award, Victoria 
 2013: Winner, Woollahra Small Sculpture Prize, Sydney. Winner, Vermont Award, Wallace Art Awards. Finalist, City of Hobart Art Prize, Hobart. Finalist, Wilson Art Award, New South Wales
 2012: Winner, City of Hobart Art Prize, Hobart
 2011: Viewer’s Choice Winner, Woollahra Small Sculpture Prize, Sydney

Selected solo exhibitions 

 2018: Wholeness and the Implicit Art, New Linden Gallery, Melbourne
2015: Lullaby, Jan Murphy Gallery, Brisbane
 2014: Phantasmagoria, Sophie Gannon Gallery, Melbourne
 2013: Degustation, National Gallery of Victoria, Melbourne
 2013: For days unnumbered, Jan Murphy Gallery, Brisbane 
 2012: Sarcophagus, Sophie Gannon Gallery, Melbourne 
 2011: Nevermore, JamFactory, Adelaide
 2010: Night’s Plutonian Shore, Sophie Gannon Gallery, Melbourne
 2010: Julia deVille, Aesop stores, London
 2009: Cineraria, Sophie Gannon Gallery, Melbourne 
 2008: Ossuarium, Craft Victoria, Melbourne 
2008: Prey, Eastern Market, Melbourne
 2008: Memento Mori, Dowse Art Museum, Lower Hutt, New Zealand
 2008: Élan Vital, e.g.etal Galleries, Melbourne
 2006: Vivere Disce, Cogita Mori, Fat 3000, GPO, Melbourne
 2006: Here I Lie And Wait For Thee, e.g.etal galleries, Victoria
 2005: Disce Mori, Tsubi flagship store, New York
 2005: Puluis et Umbra Sumus, e.g.etal galleries & Workshop 3000 window, Melbourne

Selected group exhibitions 

 2016: Lorne Sculpture Biennale, Lorne Foreshore, Victoria.
 2015: Fantastic Worlds, Rockhampton Art Gallery, Queensland.  Return to Hanging Rock, Mulberry Hill, Victoria. Kennedy Prize, Kennedy Arts Foundation, Adelaide.  National Self-Portrait Prize, UQ Art Museum, Brisbane.  Gold Coast Art Prize, Gold Coast City Gallery, Queensland.  Woollahra Small Sculpture Prize, Woollahra Council Chambers, Sydney.  Manning Art Prize, Manning Regional Art Gallery, New South Wales. Storm in a Teacup, Mornington Peninsula Regional Gallery, Victoria. Victorian Craft Award, Craft Victoria, Melbourne.
 2014: Phantasmagoria, Art Gallery of South Australia, dark heart: Adelaide Biennale of Australian Art, Adelaide. Sophie Gannon Gallery, Melbourne Art Fair, Melbourne. Scope Galleries Art Award, Scope Galleries, Victoria. Domestic Bliss, Deakin University Art Gallery, Melbourne. 
 2013: Melbourne Now, National Gallery of Victoria, Melbourne. Contemporary Voices, The Fine Art Society, London. Jan Murphy Gallery, Sydney Contemporary Art Fair, Sydney. Sophie Gannon Gallery, Sydney Contemporary Art Fair, Sydney. Diorama, Woolongong City Gallery, Victoria. Second Nature, PM Gallery & House, London. Wonderworks, The Cat Street Gallery, Hong Kong. 
 2012: Small Works, Jan Murphy Gallery, Brisbane. Theatre of the World, Museum of Old and New Art (MONA), Hobart. Unexpected Pleasures, Design Museum, London. 
 2011: Tinker Tailor Soldier Sailor, Gallery Artisan, Brisbane. Lugosi’s Children, Objectspace, Auckland. Wattle: Australian Contemporary Art, The Cat Street Gallery, Hong Kong.

Bibliography 

 2016: Stephen Crafti, More is more at the home of artist Julia deVille, Australian Financial Review, 5 September Isabelle Lane, Explore Melbourne’s best by-appointment-only business, The Weekly Review, 15 July Kasumi Borczyck, Death and holograms: inside the world of Julia deVille, i-D Magazine, 27 June Julia deVille wins Waterhouse Natural Science Art Prize, ABC News, 9 June Debbie Cuthbertson, Julia deVille wins Waterhouse Natural Science Art Prize with taxidermy chicks, The Age, 9 June Iona Nelson, Julia deVille, This Wild Song, June.
 2015: Stephen Crafti, Go and get stuffed, The Sydney Morning Herald, 10 April Pip Coates, Jewellery from Chopard, Piaget and contemporary artists, Australian Financial Review, August Carrie McCarthy, Beautiful Mourning, Cultural Flanerie, 27 July Karla Dondio, The art of preservation, The Sydney Morning Herald, 28–29 November
 2014: Elfy Scott, Future of fashion Julia deVille: “Fashion is transient and hollow”, Catalogue Magazine Katie Spain, Vegan, animal lover…and taxidermist: Meet Julia deVille, The Advertiser, 1 March Nicholas Forest, Interview: Julia deVille and the Art of Death, Blouin Art Info Australia, 18 February
 2013: Exhibition catalogue for Melbourne Now, National Gallery of Victoria Nicholas Estrada, New Earrings, Thames & Hudson Taxidermy, Thames & Hudson selected publications (cont) 2013 Exhibition catalogue for Wonderworks, The Cat Street Gallery Matthew Westwood, Still life in death, The Australian, 3 December Under 5K, Australian Art Collector, July/September Chicken little, Australian Financial Review, July Belle Australia, April/May 
 2012–13: Jewel Book, International Annual of Contemporary Jewel Art, Stichting Kunstboek 
 2012: Exhibition catalogue for Unexpected Pleasures: The Art and Design of Contemporary Jewellery, Design Museum London & National Gallery of Victoria The New Jewellers, Thames & Hudson Lisa Morgan, Design Behind Desire, Faramehmedia Marthe Le Van, Push Jewellery, Lark Crafts Metalsmith Magazine, volume 32, no. 4 Culture – Melbourne Art Fair, Harper’s Bazaar, August Suzanne Carbone, Dead animals on trays cop a serve, The Sydney Morning Herald, 25 July Art to die for, Her Magazine, June/July The one and only, The Age, 28 April 
 2011: Nicholas Estrada, New Rings, Thames & Hudson Exhibition catalogue for Wattle: Australian Contemporary Art, The Cat Street Gallery Exhibition catalogue for Tinker Tailor Soldier Sailor, Artisan Julia deVille and the luxury of imagination, Neue Luxury Andrew Taylor, It’s a dying art but the deVille’s in the detail, The Sydney Morning Herald, 27 November Black Swan, Vogue Australia, August Deer Life, Vogue Living, May/June 
 2010: Museum of Mortality, Habitus, no. 7 
 2009: Dead Modern, Urbis, no. 49 Julia deVille, Artist Profile, July Stuff it, it’s Art, Art World, no. 9, June/July 
 2008: Exhibition catalogue for Just Must, Arnoldsche Art Publications Asensio Paco, Bijoux: Illustration et Design, Maomao Publications 
 2007: Julia deVille, Dumbo Feather, no. 12 2006 New Directions In Jewellery 2, Black Dog Publishing Jan Phyland, Handmade in Melbourne, Geoff Slattery Publishing 
 2006: Viviane Stappmanns & Ewan McEoin, The Melbourne Design Guide, Lab 3000 Primavera, Sunday Arts ABC, 29 October The Players – Class of 2006, Harper’s Bazaar, June/July The Abattoir, Black Magazine, March/April/May Design stars on the rise, W Jewellery, January/February/March 
 2005: Julia deVille, Object Magazine, no. 48.  
 To Die For, Oyster Magazine, no. 61. December ABC Radio, The Arts Show.   
 11 December,  Death Becomes her Art Specialty, The Melbourne Leader.  
 7 December TV One National News New Zealand.   
 20 July Dead Gorgeous Jewellery, The Age.  
 10 May Memento Mori, Pulp Magazine, no. 44  
 April/May. Immaculate Collections, The Herald Sun, 13 March. 
 2003: Stuff the mice, Vice Magazine, volume 1, no. 7.

Collections 

 City of Hobart
Museum of Old and New Art (MONA), Hobart
National Gallery of Victoria, Melbourne
Art Gallery of South Australia, Adelaide
Bendigo Art Gallery
 Deakin Art Gallery

References

External links 
 Creatives at Home: Julia deVille in Her Spacious Home Studio Published October 31, 2016  
 Julia deVille - The Mortality of Death Published August 31, 2015
 More is more at the home of artist Julia deVille Published Sep 5, 2016

Australian artists
New Zealand artists
Living people
Taxidermists
Year of birth missing (living people)